Glamorgan is a residential  neighbourhood in the southwest quadrant of Calgary, Alberta. It is bounded by Richmond Road to the north, by 37 Street W to the east, Glenmore Trail to the south and Sarcee Trail to the west.

Glamorgan was established in 1958. It is represented in the Calgary City Council by the Ward 6 councillor. Provincially, the community is part of the electoral district of Calgary-Elbow, represented by MLA Doug Schweitzer since the 2019 Alberta general election. Federally, it is part of the Calgary Signal Hill district, represented by MP Ron Liepert since the 2015 Canadian federal election.

Demographics

Residents in this community had a median household income of $51,192 in 2000, and there were 55.9% low income residents living in the neighbourhood. As of 2000, 15.9% of the residents were immigrants. A proportion of 30.8% of the buildings were condominiums or apartments, and 37.1% of the housing was used for renting.

Education
The community is served by Glamorgan Elementary public school and St. Andrew Elementary School (Catholic).

See also
List of neighbourhoods in Calgary

References

External links
Glamorgan Community Association

Neighbourhoods in Calgary